Joan Trimble (18 June 1915 – 6 August 2000) was an Irish composer and pianist.

Education and career 
Trimble was born in Enniskillen, County Fermanagh, Ireland. She studied piano with Annie Lord at the Royal Irish Academy of Music, Dublin, and music at Trinity College Dublin (BA 1936, BMus 1937) and continued her studies at the Royal College of Music (RCM), London, until 1940 (piano with Arthur Benjamin and composition with Herbert Howells and Ralph Vaughan Williams).

She first gained notice as part of a piano duo with her sister Valerie (1917–1980), earning a first prize at a Belfast music competition as early as 1925. Joan also composed a number of works for two pianos which the duo performed. A 1938 recital at the RCM, at which they performed three of them, was their breakthrough. Other composers wrote works for them, too, including Jamaican Rumba by Arthur Benjamin, which became a signature tune for the duo. Trimble's Phantasy Trio (1940) won the Cobbett Prize for chamber music. The sisters also performed modern music, including works by Stravinsky, Dallapiccola, Arthur Bliss and Lennox Berkeley and continued to perform in public until 1970. Trimble married in 1942 and had children, which restricted her compositional output. In 1957 her opera Blind Raftery was the third opera commissioned by the BBC for television, and the first television opera written by a female composer. Between 1959 and 1977 she taught piano at the RCM, with the years since 1967 travelling from Northern Ireland.

Joan Trimble's music is conservative for her time. She combined the impressionist harmonic language she had learned since her studies with Annie Lord with melodic and rhythmic inflections derived from Irish traditional music. Her arrangements of Irish airs for two pianos do not differ stylistically from her original compositions. Her most advanced music will be found in the Sonatina for two pianos (1940) and the impressive song cycle The County Mayo (1949). Trimble's music is always melodic, tastefully written, and rewarding for performers.

After her father's death in 1967 she went to work on his newspaper, The Impartial Reporter in Enniskillen, and cared for her husband who was severely ill for decades. She regained some attention in the 1990s when she was commissioned for a new composition and the first recordings of her music appeared. She died in Enniskillen just two weeks after her husband.

Legacy
On 18 June 2015 "Music in Fermanagh" presented A Celebration Concert, as part of the Joan Trimble Centenary Celebration, at the Ardhowen Theatre in Enniskillen.

Works
List derived from Jamieson (2013), see Bibliography.

Opera
Blind Raftery, television opera in two scenes (BBC, May 1957)

Orchestra
15 Ulster Airs (arrangements of trad. tunes, 1939–40)
In Glenade for string orchestra (1942)
Suite for Strings for string orchestra (1951)

Chamber Music
The Coolin (Irish air) (1939) for cello & piano. London: Hawkes & Son, c.1939.
Phantasy Trio (1940) for violin, cello, piano
The Pool among the Rushes (1941) for clarinet & piano
Erin go Bragh (1943) for brass band
Introduction and Air (1969) for two harps. Cork: Mercier Press, 1969 (in The Irish Harp Book ed. by Sheila Larchet-Cuthbert).
Three Diversions (1990) for wind quintet

Music for two pianos
The Humours of Carrick (1938). London: Winthrop Rogers, c.1938.
The Bard of Lisgoole (1938)
Buttermilk Point (1938). London: Winthrop Rogers, c.1939.
Sonatina (1940). London: Winthrop Rogers, 1941.
The Green Bough (1941). London: Boosey & Hawkes, 1951.
Pastorale (Hommage à F. Poulenc) (1943)
The Gartan Mother's Lullaby (1949). London: Boosey & Co., 1949.
The Heather Glen (1949). London: Boosey & Co., 1949.
Puck Fair (1951)

Songs
My Grief on the Sea (Douglas Hyde) (1937)
Girl's Song (Wilfrid Wilson Gibson) (1937)
Green Rain (Mary Webb) (1937). London: Winthrop Rogers, 1938.
The County Mayo, song cycle (James Stephens) (1949)

Recordings
 Celtic Keyboards: Duets by Irish Composers, performed by Bruce Posner & Donald Garvelmann (pianos), on: Koch International Classics 3-7287-2 H1 (CD, 1994). Contains: Sonatina, The Gartan Mother's Lullaby, The Heather Glen, The Bard of Lisgoole, Buttermilk Point, The Green Bough, The Humours of Carrick.
 Silver Apples of the Moon – Irish Classical Music, performed by Irish Chamber Orchestra, Fionnuala Hunt (cond.), on: Black Box Music BBM 1003 (CD, 1997). Contains: Suite for Strings.
 Joan Trimble: Two Pianos – Songs and Chamber Music, performed by Patricia Bardon (mezzo), Joe Corbett (baritone), Una Hunt (piano), Roy Holmes (piano), Dublin Piano Trio, on: Marco Polo 8.225059 (CD, 1999). Contains: The Cows are a-milking, A Gartan Mother's Lullaby, The Heather Glen, My Grief on the Sea, Green Rain, Girl's Song, Sonatina, Pastorale (Hommage à F. Poulenc), Phantasy Trio, Puck Fair, The Green Bough, The County Mayo, Buttermilk Point, The Bard of Lisgoole, The Humours of Carrick.
 Phantasy Trio, performed by Fidelio Trio, on: RTÉ lyric fm CD 153 (CD, 2016).
The Pool Among the Rushes, performed by John Finucane (clarinet) and Elisaveta Blumina (piano), on: Genuin GEN 18495 (CD, 2018).
 Green Rain; Girl's Song; My Grief on the Sea, performed by Carolyn Dobbin (mezzo) & Iain Burnside (piano), on: Delphian Records DCD 34187 (CD, 2018).

Bibliography
 Philip Hammond: "Woman of Parts: Joan Trimble", in: Soundpost 5 (1984–85), p. 24–7.
 "Joan Trimble", in: Contemporary Music Review 9 (1994), p. 277–84.
 Axel Klein: Die Musik Irlands im 20. Jahrhundert (Hildesheim: Georg Olms, 1996).
 Lisa McCarroll: The Celtic Twilight as Reflected in the Two-Piano Works of Joan Trimble (1915-2000) (DMA dissertation, Moores School of Music, University of Houston, 2013).
 Ruth Stanley: Joan Trimble (1915–2000) and the Issue of her 'Irish' Musical Identity (MA thesis, Mary Immaculate College, University of Limerick, 2003; unpublished).
 Alasdair Jamieson, : "Trimble, Joan" and "Trimble, Valerie", in: The Encyclopaedia of Music in Ireland, ed. by Harry White & Barra Boydell (Dublin: UCD Press, 2013), p. 1008–9.
 Alasdair Jamieson: Music in Northern Ireland. Two Major Figures: Havelock Nelson (1917–1996) and Joan Trimble (1915–2000) (Tolworth, Surrey: Grosvenor House Publishing, 2017), .

References

External links
 Profile at Contemporary Music Centre, Dublin.

1915 births
2000 deaths
20th-century classical composers
20th-century classical pianists
20th-century people from Northern Ireland
20th-century women composers
Alumni of the Royal College of Music
Alumni of the Royal Irish Academy of Music
Alumni of Trinity College Dublin
Classical composers from Northern Ireland
Classical musicians from Northern Ireland
Classical pianists from Northern Ireland
Composers for piano
Composers from Northern Ireland
Women classical composers from Northern Ireland
Women opera composers
Irish classical composers
Irish women classical composers
Musicians from County Fermanagh
Opera composers from Northern Ireland
People from Enniskillen
Women classical pianists
20th-century women pianists